George Peak, at , is the second highest peak in the Raft River Mountains of Utah. The peak is located in Sawtooth National Forest and Box Elder County.

References

External links
 

Mountains of Utah
Mountains of Box Elder County, Utah
Sawtooth National Forest